The visit of Deng Xiaoping to the United States was the first official visit by a paramount leader of China to the US. Deng undertook the visit in his official capacities as Vice Chairman of the Chinese Communist Party, First Vice Premier of the State Council and Chairman of the Chinese People's Political Consultative Conference. The visit initiated a series of high-level exchanges that would continue until the spring of 1989. It was the most important Chinese diplomatic visit to the country since Soong Mei-ling, wife of Chiang Kai-shek of the Republic of China, in 1943. Announced on 15 December 1978, the visit began in late January 1979 and went on into February.

Meetings and ceremonies

Visit to Washington D.C. (29-31 January)

Welcoming ceremony and bilateral meetings
Deng arrived in the capital Washington D.C. on 29 January with his wife Zhuo Lin. He was welcomed to the White House with full military honors from the 3rd U.S. Infantry Regiment (The Old Guard), Ceremonial Company A at Marine Barracks Washington, the United States Navy Ceremonial Guard, the United States Air Force Honor Guard, the United States Coast Guard Ceremonial Honor Guard as well as the United States Army Band. A 19-gun salute was also fired in honor of Deng.

During a bilateral meeting with Carter, he criticized Soviet relations with Vietnam, saying the following to him and Secretary Cyrus Vance:

Deng sought an endorsement from the United States in order to deter the Soviet Union from intervening when China launched a contemplated punitive attack against Vietnam. He informed Carter that China could not accept Vietnam's "wild ambitions" and was prepared to teach it a lesson. According to United States National Security Advisor Zbigniew Brzezinski, Carter reserved judgment, an action which Chinese diplomats interpreted as tacit approval for China's invasion of Vietnam during the Sino-Vietnamese war, which China launched shortly after Deng's return from the United States visit. According to academic Suisheng Zhao, "The proximity in the timing of the military thrust to take advantage of the normalization to bluff the Soviets with a nonexistent US endorsement."

When Carter attempted to raise the issue of human rights in China during their discussions, Deng quipped that he could provide as many as two hundred million Chinese, if necessary, to the United States for the protection of human rights.

State dinner

The evening of 29 January, a state dinner was held in honor of Deng and his delegation at the White House. It marked the first return of former President Richard Nixon to the White House since his resignation speech in August 1974. Originally, President Carter refused to invite Nixon, however Deng had stated that he would visit him at his California residence if he was not invited. During the dinner, Nixon had a private meeting with both Deng and Carter. A string section from the United States Air Force Band began to perform as dessert was being served. Following the dinner, Deng and Carter went to the John F. Kennedy Center for the Performing Arts to witness performances by groups such as the Joffrey Ballet as well as singers such as John Denver and Shirley MacLaine.

Joint Communique

The Joint Communiqué on the Establishment of Diplomatic Relations was signed during the visit. It followed the announcement of the ending of official U.S. recognition of the Republic of China (commonly known as "Taiwan"), in December 1978 as well as the full withdrawal of all U.S. military personnel from Taiwan and the end to the Sino-American Mutual Defense Treaty.

Visit to Georgia (1-2 February)

On 1 February, he arrived in Atlanta, the capital of the state of Georgia, Carter's home state. In Atlanta he visited the headquarters of Coca Cola and later toured the Atlanta Assembly owned by the Ford Motor Company in Hapeville. A banquet was held in honor of Deng the evening of 2 February. The Atlanta Chapter of the National Association of Chinese-Americans was inaugurated the following year as a result of his visit.

Visit to Texas (2-3 February)

On the morning of 2 February, he arrived at Houston Intercontinental Airport where he was greeted by Mayor of Houston Jim McConn. He arrived on Air Force One with local congressman Mickey Leland. At the arrival ceremony, McConn presented Deng with a box of silver spurs. During this visit he visited the Johnson Space Center and Hughes Tool Company. During the former visit, he climbed on top of a lunar rover used by the Apollo 11 mission. That evening, he was presented a Stetson cowboy hat during a rodeo he attended in Simonton hosted by what is now the Greater Houston Partnership.

Visit to the State of Washington (3-5 February)
He arrived in the evening on 3 February at Boeing Field in Seattle before being transported to the Washington Plaza Hotel. He was accompanied by United States Secretary of Energy James R. Schlesinger, Governor Dixy Lee Ray and Senators Warren Magnuson and Henry M. Jackson. He also visited former Secretary of State Henry Kissinger. He visited a factory which assembles Boeing 747s.

Reactions and aftermath
Carter stated that he found Deng, "small, tough, intelligent, frank, courageous, personable, self-assured, [and] friendly."

Most of the American public's reaction toward the visit was hostile, with anti-communists and nationalists staging protests. Four days prior to his visit, a group of anti-Deng protesters broke the entrance glass to what is now the Embassy of China in Washington, D.C. During the welcoming ceremony at the White House, two protesters were taken away from the press area after chanting anti-Chinese slogans. In Houston, there was an assassination attempt by a Ku Klux Klan member against Deng. The KKK member, who rushed to the podium where Deng was speaking with a knife, was intercepted by an agent of the United States Secret Service. American Maoist Bob Avakian, along with his group Revolutionary Communist Party, USA, protested Deng at the White House and denounced him as a "capitalist roader", and 17 party members, including Avakian, were later charged with multiple felonies including assaulting a police officer. Avakian and many RCP members fled abroad, and the charges were eventually dropped in 1982.

On March 1, 1979, formal embassies were established in the capitals of the two countries. Vice President Walter Mondale reciprocated Deng's visit with a trip to Mainland China in August 1979. Two weeks later, the SS Letitia Lykes entered Shanghai harbor in the first US-flagged ship to visit the PRC in 30 years. This visit led to agreements in September 1980 on maritime affairs, civil aviation links, and textile matters, as well as a bilateral consular convention.

See also
State visit by Ngo Dinh Diem to the United States
1972 visit by Richard Nixon to China
China–United States relations
State visits to the United States

References

External links

Houston Texas Deng Xiao Ping 1979
China 1979: Deng Xiaoping visits Texas February 2nd 1979

Deng Xiaoping
China–United States relations
1979 in China
1979 in the United States
Deng Xiaoping
1979 in international relations
January 1979 events in the United States
February 1979 events in the United States